Ben Daly is an Australian former rugby union player. He played his club rugby for various clubs including Glasgow Warriors, Worcester Warriors and Newport Gwent Dragons.

Scottish-Qualified as both his parents are Scottish, Daly had a training contract with the New South Wales Waratahs when he decided to move to Scotland to play rugby, in the home city of his parents.

He signed for Glasgow Warriors in 2002 making his debut in the pre-season match against Harlequins. He played 4 matches in the Celtic League in the 2002–03 season, 2 in the 2002-03 Scottish Inter-District Championship and 1 in the Heineken Cup.

He moved from Glasgow to sign for the Worcester Warriors in England before moving to Italian side Viadana.

He signed for Newport Gwent Dragons in 2006 but retired at the end of the 2007–08 season.

References

External links
Newport profile

Australian rugby union players
Dragons RFC players
Living people
Glasgow Warriors players
Worcester Warriors players
Rugby Viadana players
1975 births
Rugby union hookers
Rugby union players from Leeds